Abeer Abu Ghaith (born c. 1985) is a Palestinian technology entrepreneur, and social activist. She is the founder of MENA Alliances and formally a co-founder of StayLinked. Abu Ghaith has been celebrated as, "Palestine's first female high-tech entrepreneur", she uses technology to provide jobs to people living in "fragile" regions, such as Gaza.

Biography  
Abeer Abu Ghaith was born c. 1985 in a Palestinian refugee camp in Jordan, and lived there until she was age 12. Later she moved back in Palestine territory with her family, she is the second oldest of 9 siblings. 

Abu Ghaith attended Palestine Polytechnic University from 2002 until 2007, and received her B.A. degree in computer systems engineering in 2007. After her graduation, she started to teach on campus. This was followed by work as the Country Director of the Women’s Campaign International (WCI) and their program, ALWANE.

From 2013 until 2015, Abu Ghaith had co-founded the company StayLinked, a service providing talent from Palestinian freelancers for businesses located in the United States and in the Middle East. The job roles included translation services, data entry, graphic design, online marketing, and website development. After leaving StayLinked in 2015, Abu Ghaith formed MENA Alliances, which does similar work in job placement.  

In 2016, Abu Ghaith went to John F. Kennedy School of Government at Harvard University, as a member of The Goldman Sachs 10,000 Women-U.S. Department of State Entrepreneurship Program for Women in the Middle East and North Africa. From 2017 to 2018, she continued her studies at Birkbeck College, University of London, and in 2018 she received a M.S. degree in business innovation. After graduation she returned to her work with MENA Alliances, where she is CEO and founder.

Awards 
 2019: "The Big Innovation Prize for the Best Dissertation in Innovation", University of London
 2015: "100 Powerful Arab under 40", Arabian Business magazine
2015: "The 100 Most Powerful Arab Women 2015", Arabian Business magazine
2014: "The 100 Most Powerful Arab Women 2015", Arabian Business magazine
 2014: "Best Technology Enabler and Facilitator” award, MEA Women in Technology Awards
 2014: “100 Most Powerful Arab Women” CEO Middle East magazine

References 

Living people
Palestinian company founders
21st-century Palestinian women
Palestine Polytechnic University alumni
Alumni of Birkbeck, University of London
Palestinians in Jordan
1980s births